Edward Preston "Teddy" Young,  & Bar (17 November 1913 – 28 January 2003), was a British graphic designer, submariner and publisher. In 1935, he joined the then new publishers Penguin Books and was responsible for designing the cover scheme used by Penguin for many years as well as drawing the original penguin logo. During World War II he served in the Royal Naval Volunteer Reserve (RNVR) and became the first British RNVR officer to command a submarine. After the war he returned to the publishing world and eventually became managing director of the Rainbird Group. Having written his wartime biography, One of Our Submarines, in 1952, he later wrote several other books.

Early life
Young was born in San Fernando, Trinidad, but he moved to London as a child. He was educated at Highgate School in London. At 18 he left school and joined publishers The Bodley Head, remaining with the firm until 1935 when he moved to join Penguin Books as production manager.

Penguin Books
Penguin Books was newly formed in 1935 by Allen Lane. Previously managing director at Bodley Head, it was Lane who invited Young to join his new company. One of the first jobs given to Young was to go to London Zoo to make sketches of penguins to be used as the symbol for Penguin Books. Reportedly he returned from this job with the comment "My God, how those birds stink!" but the logo he drew appeared on all Penguin books until 1949. Along with Lane, Young also devised the colour schemes used by the firm on book covers; orange/white/orange for novels, green for crime and detective novels, and pale blue for the Pelican series. The designs were commemorated in 2009 when the Royal Mail included Young's design in a series of stamps celebrating British design classics. Young left Penguin in 1939 to join The Reprint Society but left the society soon after with the outbreak of the war.

War service
Before reporting for submarine officer training at  he was required to undertake a period of service on a surface ship, so Young joined  on patrol in the North Sea. He was lucky in that both the commanding officer and First Lieutenant of Atherstone had served in submarines and were able to impart a lot of knowledge to Young.

In August 1940, Young reported to HMS Dolphin to find that he was the only one of the three RNVR volunteers to have progressed to training. Young therefore became the first executive branch officer of the RNVR to enter the submarine service. Young passed the course, top of the class, and was posted as a watchkeeping officer to  based at Harwich. After several operational patrols in the North Sea, H28 became part of Seventh Submarine Flotilla, a training flotilla based at Rothesay on the west coast of Scotland.

HMS Umpire
On 23 March 1941, Young was posted to the submarine , and was promoted to lieutenant on 12 April. Umpire was a new boat still undergoing commissioning trials on the River Medway. On commissioning, the boat was ordered to join Third Submarine Flotilla at Dunoon. Attached to a north bound convoy, Umpire developed an engine problem and fell slightly behind the convoy. In the dark night of 19/20 July 1941 the boat was not seen by Peter Hendriks, an armed trawler escorting a south bound convoy, and the two ships collided. Umpire sank almost immediately. Having tried to surface the boat using compressed air and having searched for other survivors, Young ended up in the conning tower with the First Lieutenant, an Engine Room Artificer (ERA) and an able seaman. Closing the hatch below them, they forced open the upper hatch and escaped. The ERA was never seen again and the First Lieutenant drowned after reaching the surface. Young and the seaman were picked up together with several men who had escaped through the engine room hatch. The Commanding Officer, Lt M Wingfield, had already been rescued, having been on the bridge when the collision occurred. All told 2 officers and 20 ratings died with only 2 officers, Young and Wingfield, and 14 ratings surviving.

S-class boats
During his time on Sealion the boat operated in Arctic waters, being based for some time in Murmansk. On return from Russia, Young was made First Lieutenant of Sealion until she was docked for a refit.

Young was then transferred to  again as First Lieutenant. For his part in this action Young was Mentioned in Despatches. In the Mediterranean Saracen was part of Tenth Submarine Flotilla based in Malta.

First command

Returning to port on Christmas Day 1942, Young received a signal ordering him to return to the United Kingdom to attend the Commanding Officer's Qualifying Course (COQC). Young commanded the boat, known as State Express after the cigarette brand, for three months before being appointed as commander of a new boat, then under construction. On his appointment to P555, Young was the first British RNVR officer to command a submarine.

HMS Storm
The boat was  then being built by Cammell Laird on the River Mersey. On commissioning Storm joined Third Submarine Flotilla and her first patrol was to northern Norway. This was to be the only patrol in European waters as Young and Storm sailed to the Pacific in late December 1943 to become part of Fourth Submarine Flotilla at Trincomalee, Ceylon (now Sri Lanka). Arriving in the Far East in February 1944, Storm carried out four patrols and one special mission from Sri Lanka. During the first two patrols they sank a Japanese navy minesweeper as well as several merchant ships. After two patrols Storm landed an agent on the Japanese held island of Pulau Weh in northwest Sumatra. Four days later, Storm returned to collect the agent, during which time the Japanese had prepared an ambush and Storm came under concerted gunfire as the two-man special forces team rowed ashore to meet the agent. Young held Storm as close as possible to the shore to allow the two men to return to the boat. Once retrieved Young dived the submarine and made for home. One member of the crew had been wounded during the exchange of gunfire.

By the end of March 1944, Young was promoted to acting lieutenant commander, this stopped a previous source of embarrassment to guests who did not know Young. Young, a Lieutenant RNVR, wore the wavy stripes of the RNVR, while his First Lieutenant, Brian Mills, was a regular Royal Navy Lieutenant and wore the straight stripes of regular officer. Many visitors to Storm did not know Young and made the assumption that Mills, as the regular officer, was the commanding officer of the submarine. During a final patrol from Trincomalee, Young took Storm into Port Owen on Tavoy Island and in a surface action sank several vessels. During another surface action on this patrol Storm became the first submarine to pick up a Japanese prisoner, when a soldier, who was a passenger on a freighter sunk by Storm, was picked up. For this series of patrols Young was awarded the Distinguished Service Order.

In September 1944, Storm was transferred to the Eighth Submarine Flotilla operating from Fremantle, Australia. Two further patrols were undertaken while based in Australia and on the second of them a short lived record was set for the longest patrol by an S-class boat, when the patrol lasted 37 days and covered . After this patrol Storm and her crew were directed to return to the United Kingdom. Leaving Australia at the end of January, Storm reached England on 8 April 1945, during which Young suffered recollections of the Umpire sinking when Storm was almost rammed by a merchant ship in fog in the Bay of Biscay. Once home, Young parted company with Storm and was promoted to commander on 31 July 1945 with a staff appointment with Seventh Submarine Flotilla aboard  becoming the only RNVR officer to hold such a post. In June, for the patrols from Fremantle a Bar to his DSC was awarded. Young left the navy in November 1945.

Postwar career
On being de-mobilized Young briefly rejoined The Reprint Society and then moved to Pan Books before moving to Rupert Hart-Davis Ltd as production director. In 1952, Young wrote his autobiography entitled One of Our Submarines which was published by Rupert Hart-Davis Ltd. Two years later, Penguin Books honoured their former member of staff by making the paperback edition of One of Our Submarines the 1000th Penguin publication.

He wrote three further non-fiction works; Look at Lighthouses (1961), The Fifth Passenger (1962) and Look at Submarines (1964) before retirement in 1973, having ended his working career as managing director of the Rainbird Publishing Group.

References
Notes

Sources

External links
 Imperial War Museum Interview

1913 births
2003 deaths
Companions of the Distinguished Service Order
English book publishers (people)
English graphic designers
People educated at Highgate School
Recipients of the Distinguished Service Cross (United Kingdom)
Royal Navy submarine commanders
Royal Naval Volunteer Reserve personnel of World War II
Penguin Books people
20th-century English businesspeople